After the Banquet (lit. "After the Wedding") is a 2009 South Korean-Japanese film starring Shin Sung-woo, Ye Ji-won, Bae Soo-bin, Kim Bo-kyung, Lee Hae-young, Seo Yoo-jung, Yoon Hee-seok, Cha Soo-yeon, and Go Ah-sung. A group of college alumni, mostly men, are reunited at a wedding. They are all looking forward to seeing one woman in particular, but to their surprise, the woman's daughter appears.

It was part of the "Telecinema7" project, seven feature-length mini-dramas which were collaborations between South Korean TV directors and Japanese TV screenwriters; the seven Korea-Japan joint productions both received a limited theater release and were broadcast on television. After the Banquet was first released in Korea in CGV theaters on December 3, 2009, and later aired on SBS (South Korea) and TV Asahi (Japan) in 2010.

Plot
In the countryside at a Catholic church, luxurious cars come rolling in. A wedding is set to take place between Ji-hong and Yoo-ri. The couple met as music club members in college. Their friends from their university days are all arriving, most of whom haven't seen each other in 10 years.

Seong-ho is now a lawyer, and married.
Hyeong-woo is now a university professor who is persistently single.
Kyeong-ho is now a production director (PD) at a television station.
Seong-joo is now a businesswoman, and she brought along her boyfriend who is 12 years younger.
Min-hee has a stable family life.

All of these friends are in their mid-thirties. During the wedding they notice that one person from their music club, Jeong-hee, is missing.

After the wedding all the friends gather together at Ji-hong and Yoo-ri's vacation house. At the evening dinner, a young girl named Mi-rae appears. She informs the group that Jeong-hee was her mother and she died in a car accident one month ago. Furthermore, she tells everyone that she came here to meet her father. Tension, shock, and surprise overtakes the friends as they recall their relationships with Jeong-hee.

Cast
Shin Sung-woo as Kim Ji-hong
Ye Ji-won as Lee Yoo-ri
Bae Soo-bin as Kim Seong-ho
Kim Bo-kyung as Han Seong-joo
Lee Hae-young as Choi Hyeong-woo
Seo Yoo-jung as Choi Min-hee
Yoon Hee-seok as Park Kyeong-ho
Cha Soo-yeon as Kim Jeong-hee
Go Ah-sung as Mi-rae
Lee Do-il as Kim Jae-won
Kim Mu-yeol as Kim Hyeon-joon
Yoon So-jung as Park Ok-soon
Kim Da-in as Yoo Jae-yeon
Lee Hwa-seon as Park Hye-ryung
Jung Jae-jin as Shin-joo

See also
The Relation of Face, Mind and Love
Heaven's Postman
19-Nineteen
Triangle
Paradise
A Dream Comes True

References

External links
 https://web.archive.org/web/20130624215141/http://telecinema7.jp/ 
 http://cafe.naver.com/telecine7/ 
 
 
 

2000s Korean-language films
Japanese romantic drama films
South Korean romantic drama films
2009 films
2009 romantic drama films
2000s Japanese films
2000s South Korean films